The Southern Highlands Line is an Intercity rail service operated by NSW TrainLink that services the Macarthur, Southern Highlands and Southern Tablelands regions of New South Wales.

One of only two routes on the NSW TrainLink intercity network to run entirely on non-electrified railway lines, the Southern Highlands Line is operated with a rolling stock solely consisting of Endeavour railcars, with most services only using two cars. The service spans  of railway, making it the most extensive route on the NSW TrainLink network apart from the Blue Mountains Line's Bathurst Bullet service. Despite that, the route spans only 22 stations, making it also the route with the lowest number of stops.

History
The Main South line opened in stages to Picton in 1863, Moss Vale in 1867 and Goulburn in 1869.

In 1919, a new section of line opened between Picton and Mittagong, with the original section becoming the Picton-Mittagong loop line. Originally a single track line, it was later doubled with the exception of the Picton-Mittagong loop line.

Services
Most services operate between Campbelltown and Moss Vale with a limited number extending to Sydney Central and Goulburn. All services are operated by NSW TrainLink using Endeavour railcars.

Rail replacement bus services operate between Picton and Bowral paralleling the Picton-Mittagong loop line and Bundanoon and Wollongong paralleling the Moss Vale-Unanderra line. A daytime bus service also operates between Moss Vale and Goulburn. Some stations are also served by NSW TrainLink XPT and Xplorer services from Sydney to Canberra, Griffith and Melbourne.

Up until the mid-1990s, most services on the line operated through to Sydney Central. Named trains that operated on the line included the Goulburn Day Train and Southern Highlands Express. In the late 1980s, air-conditioned HUB/RUB carriages were introduced. These would later be joined by Budd and Tulloch carriages and DEB railcars.

In 1994, all were replaced by Endeavour railcars. Most services were altered to operate only as far north as Campbelltown connecting with Sydney Trains electric services to Sydney.

As of 2014–15, the Southern Highlands Line experiences significantly worse peak hour on-time running performance than other suburban and intercity lines.

Stations

Patronage

References

Further reading
"Centenary of the Opening of the Southern Line to Picton", Singleton, C.C. Australian Railway Historical Society Bulletin July 1963
"Centenary of the Opening of the Southern Line to Mittagong", Singleton, C.C. Australian Railway Historical Society Bulletin March 1967
"Centenary of the Opening of the Southern Line to Goulburn", Singleton, C.C. Australian Railway Historical Society Bulletin May 1969
Southern Highlands Express Peter Attenborough, Eveleigh Press 2011

External links
Regional Transport Information Transport for NSW

NSW TrainLink